Janusz Urbańczyk (born 19 May 1967) is a Polish priest of the Catholic Church who represents the Holy See to several international bodies based in Vienna.

Biography 
Janusz Urbańczyk was born on 19 May 1967 in Kraszewice, Poland. After his philosophy and theology studies he was ordained a priest of the Roman Catholic Diocese of Elblag on 13 June 1992 and earned a doctorate in canon law. To prepare for a diplomat's career he completed the course of study at the Pontifical Ecclesiastical Academy in 1993.

He was a secretary in the Nunciatures of Bolivia (1997-2000), Slovakia (2000-2004), New Zealand (2004-2007) and as second counsellor in Kenya (2007-2010), Slovenia and Macedonia (2010-2012). In 2012, he had the title counsellor in the office of the Permanent Observer of the Holy See to the United Nations in New York.

On 12 January 2015, Pope Francis named Urbańczyk to several related positions within the diplomatic service, all based in Vienna. They include Permanent Representative of the Holy See to the International Atomic Energy Agency (IAEA), the Organization for Security and Cooperation in Europe (OSCE), and the Preparatory Commission for the Comprehensive Nuclear-Test-Ban Treaty Organization (CTBTO); as well as Permanent Observer of the Holy See at the United Nations Industrial Development Organization (ONUDI) and the United Nations Office in Vienna.

See also
 List of heads of the diplomatic missions of the Holy See

References
 

1967 births
Living people
Diplomats of the Holy See
People from Radomsko County
Pontifical Ecclesiastical Academy alumni